"You'll Be Gone" is a song co-written by Elvis Presley and published by Elvis Presley Music and released in 1965 on the Girl Happy soundtrack album and as a 45 single. The song was recorded in 1962 and was one of very few which Presley was involved in writing; his co-writers were his bodyguard Red West and Charlie Hodge. The other song that Elvis Presley composed was "That's Someone You Never Forget" in 1961 with Red West, which was on the Pot Luck LP released in 1962.

The song was recorded on Sunday, March 18, 1962, at RCA Studio B in Nashville, Tennessee.

Composition history
Red West recounted that "You'll Be Gone" was written after a suggestion or idea made by Elvis to write new lyrics for Cole Porter's 1935 classic song "Begin the Beguine", from the musical Jubilee: "Elvis recorded 'It's Now Or Never' and he wanted to take another old standard that was a great song and change the lyrics. ... He said 'I like the song "Begin the Beguine". I like the melody but I'd like to put new lyrics on it.'" The beguine had been a dance popular in Martinique and Guadeloupe in the 1930s. When Cole Porter denied permission to alter the lyrics, Elvis, West, and Charlie Hodge worked on creating new lyrics and new music for a song that would be entitled "You'll Be Gone". The song was replete with Latin rhythms and classical guitar passages.

The song was copyrighted on February 4, 1965, and re-registered on March 10. The publishing company was Elvis Presley Music, Inc.

In the liner notes to the CD Elvis by the Presleys (2005) Ernst Jorgensen wrote: "When Priscilla came to visit Elvis in the U.S. in the spring of 1962, Elvis proudly played her the new recordings he had just made in Nashville. One of these was 'You'll Be Gone,' a song that he had written himself with his good friends Red West and Charlie Hodge. To his deep frustration, Priscilla remarked that she liked his rock 'n' roll recordings better. Elvis had a fit, Priscilla was devastated, and Elvis never tried to write a song again."

Elvis Presley's wife Priscilla noted in the liner notes to the CD Elvis by the Presleys (2005): "The reason we've included it is because it's the last time Elvis ever wrote a song." She recalled that he played her the song.

Chart history
"You'll Be Gone" was released as an RCA Victor 45 picture sleeve single on February 9, 1965, as the B side of "Do the Clam", as RCA Victor 47–8500. The Jordanaires provided the background vocals. "You'll Be Gone" charted at no. 121 on Billboard.  In Canada, "You'll Be Gone" reached no. 16 on the singles chart as a double A side with "Do the Clam" in February, 1965 in a six-week chart run. The A side "Do the Clam" reached no. 21 on Billboard Hot 100 singles chart and remained on the chart for 8 weeks. The song was also released as a 7" 45 single by RCA (Teldec), 47–9686, in Germany in 1965 backed with "Blue River".

The single was also released in the UK, Australia, New Zealand, France, Japan, Greece, Egypt, South Africa, Peru, the Philippines, Turkey, and Israel. In France, the single was released as a picture sleeve 45 as RCA Victor 49801 in 1971. In Egypt, the single was released by Sono Cairo.

Appearances on albums
The song appeared on the following albums:
as a bonus track on the 1965 Girl Happy soundtrack album
the RCA 1999 CD reissue of the 1962 Pot Luck album as a bonus track
the 1992 From Nashville to Memphis: The Essential 60s Masters album
the 2003 FTD reissue of the Girl Happy soundtrack album
the 2007 Pot Luck with Elvis, 2 CD FTD Special Edition collection
the 2010 FTD/BMG Nashville Outtakes: 1961-1964 collection, Take 1 
the 2005 Elvis by the Presleys soundtrack album as alternate take 2.
The Complete Elvis Presley Masters, Legacy/RCA, 2010 
Original Album Classics, RCA/Sony Music, 2012 
The Perfect Elvis Presley Collection, Sony Music, 2012  
The Movie Soundtracks: 20 Original Albums, RCA, 2014

Personnel
 Elvis Presley - vocals
 Scotty Moore - guitar
 Harold Bradley - guitar
 Grady Martin - guitar, vibes 
 Bob Moore - bass 
 D.J. Fontana - drums 
 Buddy Harman - drums
 Floyd Cramer - piano 
 Boots Randolph - saxophone, vibes 
 Millie Kirkham - vocals 
 The Jordanaires - vocals

Cover versions
Morrissey covered "You'll Be Gone" in his live show at The Eventim Apollo on 20 September 2015 and at other concert venues. A live version of the song was included on Morrissey's 2018 Deluxe Edition of his 2017 studio album Low in High School as a bonus track. In 2015, The Global HitMakers released an instrumental version of the song on the album Elvis Presley, Volume 27. The Dance Orchestra of Klaus Hallen recorded the song
in 1998 on Elvis Songs for Dancing, Volume 2. Lou Pecci released a version of the song on Rare Elvis Six String in 2017. Joseph Hall recorded the song in 2018 on his eponymous EP CD album.

References

Sources
 Jorgensen, Ernst. Elvis Presley, A Life In Music. New York: St. Martin's Press, 1998; 
 Jorgensen, Ernst. Elvis by the Presleys. Liner Notes. BMG Heritage, 2005.
 Presley, Priscilla. Elvis by the Presleys. Liner Notes. BMG Heritage, 2005.
 Hopkins, Jerry. Elvis: A Biography. NY: Simon and Schuster, 1971.
 Victor, Adam. The Elvis Encyclopedia. Overlook Hardcover, 2008.

Elvis Presley songs
Songs written by Elvis Presley
1962 songs
1965 singles
Songs written by Red West